The 470 (Four-Seventy) is a double-handed monohull planing dinghy with a centreboard, Bermuda rig, and centre sheeting. Equipped with a spinnaker, trapeze and a large sail-area-to-weight ratio, it is designed to plane easily, and good teamwork is necessary to sail it well.

The 470 is a popular class with both individuals and sailing schools, offering a good introduction to high-performance boats without being excessively difficult to handle, but it is not a boat designed for beginners. Its smaller sister, the 420, is a stepping stone to the 470.

The 470 is a World Sailing International Class and has been an Olympic class since the 1976 games.

History
The 470 was designed in 1963 by the Frenchman André Cornu as a modern fibreglass planing dinghy to appeal to sailors of different sizes and ages. This formula succeeded, and the boat spread around the world. In 1969, the class was given international status and it has been an Olympic class since 1976. In 1988, the first Olympic women's sailing event used the 470.

Sailing 
To sail the 470, good physical fitness but not too much physical strength is required. The optimal weight of the combined crew ranges between 100 to 145 kg, making it a suitable boat for men, women and youth teams. Due to various options for sail trimming one can sail the boat well at 1 to 6 Beaufort scale, slightly above by experienced teams. For racing the 470 is a tactically demanding class, since differences in boat speed are small and the boat does not lose much speed during manoeuvers. Good teamwork between helm and crew is essential for successful racing.

Races

World and Continental Championships are organised every year with separate starts for women and men/mixed teams. There is also a World Championship for juniors and a Master World Championship. The 470 is used in regional championships such as the Asian, Mediterranean, and PanAm Games. Entries are limited in important international races, encouraging more competition by requiring qualifying races in most countries.

In the World Championships more than 30 countries have been represented. There are 65 member nations in the International Class Association and more than 40,000 boats have been built in 20 countries.

The 470 may be raced in a mixed fleet of boats, its performance being adjusted by the Portsmouth Yardstick handicapping scheme. In the RYA-administered scheme, the 470 has a Portsmouth number of 973. In the US Sailing-administered scheme, it has a D-PN of 86.3.

Construction
The 470 is a strict one-design class, and its builder must be approved a Licensed Builder by World Sailing.  The class design may evolve, but its intent is to use proven, economical, and environmentally sound materials, currently fibreglass with integral buoyancy tanks for the hull.

Events

Olympics
At the Olympic Games, the 470 Class was initially an open class, but since the 1988 games there have been separate events for men and women. Since 2008 each consists of a 10-race series, with teams being awarded points on a point-per-place system, and each team's worst result being discarded. The top 10 boats qualify for the medal race, in which double points are awarded.. At the 2024 Olympics, the 470 will be sailed by a mixed crew only.

Men

Women

470 World Championships

Open

Men and Mixed

Men

Women

470 World Junior Championships

Men

Women

See also
ISAF Sailing World Championships
International Sailing Federation

References

External links

 Official class website
 International Sailing Federations 470 Microsite

 
Dinghies
1960s sailboat type designs
Sailboat type designs by French designers